The Matagorda Ship Channel is a channel constructed between 1962 and 1966 that allows ocean-going vessels to travel between the Gulf of Mexico and Matagorda Bay. The channel is part of the Port of Port Lavaca – Point Comfort, a major sea port in the U.S. state of Texas.

See also
Aframax
Cargo Ship Capacity
List of Panamax ports
Panamax

References

External links
NOAA Nautical Chart 11317
NOAA Nautical Chart 11319

Ports and harbors of Texas
Ship canals
Canals in Texas
Bodies of water of the Gulf of Mexico
Transportation in Calhoun County, Texas
Canals opened in 1966
1966 establishments in Texas